John Robert Jenkins (born January 31, 1979) is an American football former kicker in the National Football League for the Baltimore Ravens.

Football career
Jenkins played football at Marshall University from 1997 to 2001 as a kicker, handling kickoff duties for the first two seasons before becoming the team's primary kicker in 1999. He went undrafted in the 2001 NFL Draft.

Detroit Fury
After leaving Marshall University, Jenkins signed with the Detroit Fury of the Arena Football League on June 6, 2001, to replace Detroit's previous kicker, Kent Baker. During a playoff game against the Arizona Rattlers, Jenkins kicked a 57-yard field goal, the longest of his professional football career. He left the AFL April 22, 2002, to sign with the Baltimore Ravens of the NFL.

Baltimore Ravens
During the 2001–02 offseason, the Baltimore Ravens signed Jenkins to perform kickoff duties, as his leg was much stronger than incumbent kicker Matt Stover's leg. During his tenure with the Ravens, he attempted 1 field goal against the Tampa Bay Buccaneers, which was blocked by Ellis Wyms. He was put on the practice squad after week 10 due to injuries. He would go on to be assigned to NFL Europe with the Berlin Thunder for the off season. He was eventually cut after the 3rd preseason game in 2003

Berlin Thunder
Jenkins was assigned to the Berlin Thunder of NFL Europe during the 2003 NFL off-season. Again, he was mostly used as a kickoff and long field goal specialist, going 6/11 on field goal attempts, making 2/4 of his attempts of 50+ yards.

References

1979 births
Living people
American football placekickers
Baltimore Ravens players
Berlin Thunder players
Detroit Fury players
Marshall Thundering Herd football players
Players of American football from Illinois
Sportspeople from Springfield, Illinois